Bukwo District is a district in the Eastern Region of Uganda. The town of Bukwo is its main political, administrative, and commercial center and the site of the district headquarters.

Location
Bukwo District is bordered by Amudat District to the north, Kenya to the east and south, and Kween District to the west and northwest.

Overview
The district was created on 1 July 2005. Before then, Bukwo District was part of Kapchorwa District. It was created out of Kongasis county.

The district has many well-educated people, but many have left to find greater prosperity in the neighbouring country of Kenya.

Many of the district's roads are inaccessible or impassable. There is a widespread lack of electricity and telecommunication services throughout the district. The various Ugandan governments have not developed this part of the country, starting with the colonial governments in the early part of the 20th century, through the Obote I, Idi Amin, Obote II, and National Resistance Movement regimes.

Many of the inhabitants of Bukwo District live in abject poverty. The district is also plagued by persistent insecurity due to cattle raids and cattle rustling by ethnic groups from Karamoja located in northeastern Uganda and the Turkana and Pokot peoples from neighbouring Kenya. These challenges date to the 1950s and 1960s.

Most of the people from the northern part of the district have been internally displaced by cattle rustlers and have since not been resettled back in their original land. Some of these people opted to purchase land from areas that appeared secure while others who could not afford to purchase new land continue to exist as squatters on well-wishers' land.

Population
In 1991, the national population census estimated the district population at 30,700. The national census in 2002 estimated the population at 49,000, with an annual population growth rate of 4.2 percent. In 2012, the population was estimated at 73,400.

In 2014 the population projection of 2020 an estimate of 119.100

Peoples living in Bukwo District are the sebei / Kalenjin very friendly people speaking Kupsabiny language.

Sub-Counties 

Bukwo Town Council
Bukwo Sub-County
Tulel Sub-County
Suam Sub-County
Senendet Sub-County
Riwo Town council
Riwo Sub-County
Brim subcounty
Kortek Sub-County
Kaptererwo Sub-County
Kamet Sub-County
Amanang subcounty
Kabei Sub-County
Lwongon Sub-County
Mutushet Sub-County
Chesower Sub-County
Chepkwasta Sub-County
Kapsarur Sub-County

All these are sub-counties that make up Bukwo District in Kongasis County.

Notable People
Joshua Cheptegei 10,000m 2020 Olympic Gold Medalist
Jacob Kiplimo 5,000m runner
Peruth Chemutai 3,000m SC 2020 Olympic Gold Medalist
Moses Ndiema Kipsiro 500m Distance Runner.

Economic Activities 
Subsistence agriculture is the main economic activity in Bukwo District. Crops grown include the following:

 Millet
 Potatoes
 Beans
 Apples
 Coffee
 Wheat
 Tomatoes
 Cabbage
 Passion fruit
 Onions
 Maize

Animal husbandry is practiced; the livestock domesticated are mainly cattle, goats, sheep, donkeys, hogs and chicken.

See also
 Districts of Uganda
 Sebei
 Kalenjin
 Kupsabiny
 Eastern Region Uganda

References

External links
  Bukwo District Gets First Borehole Worth Sh26 Million

 
Sebei sub-region
Districts of Uganda
Eastern Region, Uganda